Fishburne Military School (FMS) is a private, military boarding school for boys in Waynesboro, Virginia, United States. It was founded by James A. Fishburne in 1879 and is one of the oldest military schools in the country.

History 
James A. Fishburne, a student and protégé of Robert E. Lee, opened the coed Waynesboro High School in 1879. The school became male only in 1881 and a series of name changes followed: Fishburne Home School in 1882, Fishburne School in 1883, and finally Fishburne Military School in 1886, two years after the school adopted a military program. The school is listed on the Junior Reserve Officers' Training Corps charter and has continuously been rated an Army JROTC Honor Unit since 1924. In 1951, the Fishburne-Hudgins Educational Foundation, Inc. was formed as a Virginia non-profit and since that time has owned and operated the school.

Campus 
The 1916 Gothic Revival barracks designed by Staunton architect T.J. Collins was added to the National Register of Historic Places on October 4, 1984 (Ref. # #84000058). It is the center of the Fishburne campus and dominates downtown Waynesboro as it sits on a hill overlooking the school's parade and athletic field.  The barracks building is constructed in the form of an open three floor rectangle with cadet rooms, some offices, and most classrooms facing the open Quadrangle. Attached to the barracks themselves is a wing containing the chapel above the mess hall which is above the swimming pool.

Attached to the barracks by a breezeway is the administrative/gym building.  The most recent occupied campus building, sitting on the southeast corner is Hobby-Hudgins Hall, combining a modern computer center and library with physical education facilities including locker rooms and weight room.

Notable alumni 
 Gerald L. Baliles, 1959, Governor of Virginia 
 John Campbell, bassist of heavy metal band Lamb of God
 Reno Collier, stand-up comedian
 ED Denson, music group manager, producer, record label owner
 Daniel Dixon, professional basketball player
 Jonathan Edwards, singer and songwriter
 Otto Felix, 1962, actor, writer
 Samuel Lightfoot Flournoy, lawyer and politician
 Leonel Gómez Vides, Salvadoran activist
 John L. Hanigan, businessman
 Monk McDonald, college athlete, a head coach for the North Carolina Tar Heels men's basketball team
 Vince McMahon, 1964, WWE (formerly WWF) chairman and founder of the XFL
 John O. Noonan, 1999, conservative policy advisor and writer for The Weekly Standard
 John J. Rowlands, journalist, writer, and outdoorsman 
 W. Richard Stevens, technical author

Notable faculty 

 John W. Fishburne, Virginia Congressman
 Joel Greenspoon, psychology researcher, professor, and clinician

See also 

 Association of Military Colleges and Schools of the United States
 List of boarding schools in the United States
 List of high schools in Virginia
 Virginia Association of Independent Schools

References

External links 
 
 Fishburne-Hudgins Educational Foundation

School buildings on the National Register of Historic Places in Virginia
Boarding schools in Virginia
National Register of Historic Places in Waynesboro, Virginia
Military high schools in the United States
Buildings and structures in Waynesboro, Virginia
Private middle schools in Virginia
Private high schools in Virginia
Educational institutions established in 1879
1879 establishments in Virginia